Seven referendums were held in Switzerland in 1987. The first four were held on 5 April on amendments to the laws on asylum and foreign residents (both approved), a popular initiative "for the people's co-determination of military expenditure" (rejected) and a federal resolution on the voting system for popular initiatives that also have counter-proposals (approved).

The last three were held on 6 December on a federal resolution on the Rail 2000 project (approved), an amendment to the federal law on health insurance (rejected) and a popular initiative "for the protection of fens - Rothenthurm Initiative" (approved).

Results

April: Amendment to the asylum law

April: Amendment to the foreign residents law

April: Military expenditure

April: Voting procedure for popular initiatives

December: Rail 2000

December: Amendment to the Health insurance law

December: Fen protection (Rothenthurm initiative)

References

1987 referendums
1987 in Switzerland
Referendums in Switzerland